Iurie Iovu (born 6 July 2002) is a Moldovan professional footballer who plays as a defender for HNL club Istra 1961, on loan from Venezia. He represents the Moldova national team.

Club career
He was raised in the system of Cagliari and began receiving call-ups to their senior squad in early 2022. He remained on the bench on all those occasions.

On 31 August 2022, Iovu signed a two-year contract with Serie B club Venezia and was immediately loaned out to Istra 1961 in Croatia, with an obligation to buy.

International career
He made his debut for Moldova national football team on 15 November 2021 in a World Cup qualifier against Austria.

References

External links
 
 

2002 births
Footballers from Chișinău
Living people
Moldovan footballers
Moldova youth international footballers
Moldova under-21 international footballers
Moldova international footballers
Association football defenders
Cagliari Calcio players
Venezia F.C. players
NK Istra 1961 players
Moldovan expatriate footballers
Expatriate footballers in Italy
Moldovan expatriate sportspeople in Italy
Expatriate footballers in Croatia
Moldovan expatriate sportspeople in Croatia